Divín is a village and municipality in the Lučenec District in the Banská Bystrica Region of Slovakia.

History
In historical records, the village was first mentioned in 1329 as a parish and a castle (1329 castrum Dyun' villa sub eodem castro, 1393 Dyen, Dyuen, 1497 Dywyn, 1473 Dewen). Many noble families ruled the village and lived in the castle: Tomay, Lossonczy, Balassa, Zichy. In 1575 the fortress was occupied by Turks up to 1593. In 1604, it passed to nobles Bocskay, and after to Balassa family again. In 1674, the castle was destroyed by General Strassoldo.

Genealogical resources

The records for genealogical research are available at the state archive "Statny Archiv in Banska Bystrica, Slovakia"

 Roman Catholic church records (births/marriages/deaths): 1686-1895 (parish A)
 Lutheran church records (births/marriages/deaths): 1847-1904 (parish B)

See also
 List of municipalities and towns in Slovakia

External links
 
 
http://www.e-obce.sk/obec/divin/divin.html
Surnames of living people in Divin

Villages and municipalities in Lučenec District
Castles in Slovakia